Fairview High School is a public, coeducational, comprehensive BVSD secondary school located in Boulder, Colorado,  northwest of Denver. More than two thousand students attend the school. It is in the 5A category of the Colorado High School Activities Association (CHSAA). The school's enrollment was 2,226 in the 2020–21 school year.

Demographics

Academics 

In 2020, Fairview was ranked 249th by U.S. News & World Report in their National High School Rankings; 7th best high school in Colorado, also by US News; 2nd best public high school in Colorado by Niche; and best college prep public high school in Colorado, also by Niche. The school offers kids help with college preparation through its College and Career Center. Fairview has a reputation for being academically demanding.

Athletics

Sports offered

Fall
 Cross country
 Golf, boys'
 Football
 Soccer, boys'
 Tennis, boys'
 Softball
 Volleyball
 Cheer/Poms
 Mountain biking

Winter
Basketball
Cheer/Poms
Swimming and diving, girls'
Hockey, boys'
Wrestling

Spring
Baseball
Swimming and diving, boys'
Lacrosse
Golf, girls'
Soccer, girls'
Tennis, girls'
Track and field

State Championships

Aidan Atkinson Sexual Assault Scandal 
On November 22, 2019, the Fairview High School football team's star quarterback and three star Northwestern recruit, Aidan Atkinson, was arrested on three counts of sexual assault, five counts of unlawful sexual misconduct, and one count of attempted sexual assault after he turned himself in to police. In December 2019, he was notably excluded from Northwestern's early signees in the 2020 recruiting class. The alleged sexual assault occurred aboard a party bus on September 15, 2018. A victim alleged that Atkinson began to touch her inappropriately after she became intoxicated and was incapacitated. She also alleged that his behavior continued throughout the night. More charges were added three months later after other allegations of inappropriate conduct were brought to police. At the time, Atkinson and all victims were minors. During the fallout of the scandal, a social worker at the school was charged with failing to report child abuse after it was alleged that a victim had told her about the assaults, though she was later acquitted by jury. Due to the COVID-19 Pandemic, Atkinson's trial was postponed from November 9, 2020 to February 1, 2021. The case was reported on by the USA Today, the Denver Post, and the Boulder Daily Camera, among other publications.

As of December 14, 2020, Atkinson still holds multiple Colorado state football records including, but not limited to, most career passing completions; most passing yards in a game; most passing touchdowns in a game; most career touchdowns; most career passing yards; and first and second most passing touchdowns in a season.

Notable alumni

Academics
Lada Adamic, network scientist
 Natalia Toro (1999) - physicist at the Perimeter Institute

Entertainment and music
 Jessica Biel (born 1982, class of 2000) - actress in films and television, played Mary Camden in TV series 7th Heaven, married to singer-actor Justin Timberlake; Biel never fully attended Fairview, she was only tutored there, though she did attend feeder school Southern Hills Middle.
 Ace Young (born 1980, class of 1999) - American Idol finalist
 Jill Goodacre (born 1964, class of 1982) - former model and actress, married to musician Harry Connick Jr.
 Sheryl Lee (born 1967, class of 1985) - actress, played Laura Palmer on TV show Twin Peaks
 Rudresh Mahanthappa (born, 1971, class of 1988) - jazz alto saxophonist and composer, Guggenheim fellow
 Dizzy Reed - keyboardist, Guns N' Roses
 Jacob Sproul (born 1983, Class of 2001) - rhythm guitarist and vocalist of rock band Rose Hill Drive
 Joan Van Ark (born 1943, class of 1961) - actress, played Valene Ewing in primetime soap opera Knots Landing
 Sheree J. Wilson (born 1958, class of 1977) - played April on TV series Dallas, and Alex on Walker, Texas Ranger
 Sean Foreman (Born 1985, class of 2003) - Vocalist for the electronic pop duo 3OH!3.

Athletics
 Joe Barry (born 1970), assistant head coach and linebackers coach for Los Angeles Rams
 Kenny Bell (born 1992, class of 2010) - NFL wide receiver for Baltimore Ravens, Tampa Bay Buccaneers
 Tony Boselli (born 1972, class of 1991) - Hall of Fame NFL offensive tackle selected 2nd overall in 1995 NFL Draft and first overall in 2002 NFL Expansion Draft; five-time Pro Bowler (1996-2000); three-time All-Pro (1997–99); career cut short due to injuries following 2002 season
 Tom Chambers (born 1959, class of 1977) - basketball player, selected 8th overall in 1981 NBA Draft, four-time All-Star, played for 1992-93 Phoenix Suns team that went 62-20 and lost to Chicago Bulls in NBA Finals
 Jesse Crain (born 1981, class of 1999) - MLB pitcher for Minnesota Twins and Chicago White Sox high school teammate and good friend of American Idol Finalist and songwriter Ace Young
 Daryl Dickey (born 1961), football administrator, coach and player; head coach at University of West Georgia 2008-13
 Chris Foote (born 1956), NFL center for Baltimore Colts, New York Giants and Minnesota Vikings
 Jay Howell (born 1955), three-time All-Star MLB pitcher
 Carlo Kemp (born 1998), American football player
 Scott Lockwood (born 1968) - NFL running back who played two seasons with New England Patriots
 Dustin Lyman - NFL football player who played for five seasons for Chicago Bears
 John Mozeliak (born 1969, class of 1987) - general manager of MLB's St. Louis Cardinals; 2011 World Series champion
Shane O'Neill (born 1993, class of 2012) - professional soccer player for MLS side Seattle Sounders FC
 Chuck Pagano (born 1960, class of 1979) - NFL head coach, Indianapolis Colts, 2012-2017 
 John Pagano (born 1967, class of 1985) - assistant coach of NFL's Oakland Raiders; defensive coordinator for San Diego Chargers 2012-16
 Cat Zingano (born 1982) - wrestler; professional mixed martial arts fighter, UFC's bantamweight division
 Margo Hayes (born 1998, class of 2016) - professional climber and the first woman to climb a route graded 9a+

Other
Ishani Shrestha (born 1991, class of 2009) - 2013 Miss World Top 10 contestant and winner of 2013 Beauty With a Purpose, Miss Nepal 2013
Jessica Watkins - geologist, former international rugby player, aquanaut and NASA astronaut.

References

External links

 
 Boulder Valley School District homepage

Public high schools in Colorado
International Baccalaureate schools in Colorado
Schools in Boulder County, Colorado
Educational institutions established in 1960
1960 establishments in Colorado